Godfrey Blundell Samuelson (3 June 1863 – 3 November 1941) was a British Liberal Party politician. He sat in the House of Commons from 1887 to 1892.

Samuelson unsuccessfully contested the 1885 general election in the Tewkesbury division of Gloucestershire.  He was unsuccessful again at the 1886 general election in the Frome division of Somerset, where he was defeated by the Conservative candidate in what had been a Liberal-held seat.

He entered Parliament the following year, when he was elected at by-election in July 1887 as the Member of Parliament (MP) for the Forest of Dean, following the resignation of the Liberal MP Thomas Blake.

Samuelson did not stand again at the next general election, in 1892.

References

External links 
 

1863 births
1941 deaths
Liberal Party (UK) MPs for English constituencies
UK MPs 1886–1892